Cases-de-Pène is a commune in the Pyrénées-Orientales department in southern France.

Geography

Localisation 
Cases-de-Pène is located in the canton of La Vallée de l'Agly and in the arrondissement of Perpignan.

Politics and administration

Mayors

Population and society

Demography

Education 
The town of Cases-de-Pène has a kindergarten and elementary school, with about 112 children.

Following a conflict between the mayor and the teacher in 1908, as she refused to resign, the mayor had a brickwall built in front of the school's entrance to force her to leave.

See also
Communes of the Pyrénées-Orientales department

References

Communes of Pyrénées-Orientales